The Men's Water Polo Tournament at the 2005 Mediterranean Games was held in the Las Almadrabillas Sports Centre from Wednesday June 29 to Sunday July 3, 2005 in Almería, Spain.

Teams

GROUP A

GROUP B

Preliminary round

Group A

Wednesday June 29, 2005

Thursday June 30, 2005

Friday July 1, 2005

Group B

Wednesday June 29, 2005

Thursday June 30, 2005

Friday July 1, 2005

Final round

Semi finals
Saturday July 2, 2005

Finals
Saturday July 2, 2005 — 7th/8th place

Saturday July 2, 2005 — 5th/6th place

Sunday July 3, 2005 —  Bronze Medal Match

Sunday July 3, 2005 —  Gold Medal Match

Final ranking

Awards

See also
2005 FINA Men's World Water Polo Championship
2006 Men's European Water Polo Championship

References
 Results
 Official Results pp. 39-40. 

Sports at the 2005 Mediterranean Games
M
2005
2005